Caer Castell Camp, also known as Caer Castell Ring Motte, is a medieval motte and ditch in Rumney in Cardiff, Wales, which is a scheduled monument.

History
Motte-and-bailey castles date back to the medieval period, from 1066 to 1540 AD. As such, the motte is of national importance, which may improve our understanding of medieval defensive structures.

Present day
Caer Castell Camp is today located within the grounds of St Illtyd's Catholic High School. Some landscaping has been carried out but the site is overgrown with trees, shrubs and brambles.

See also
List of castles in Wales
Castles in Great Britain and Ireland
List of scheduled monuments in Cardiff
List of motte-and-bailey castles

References

External links

 

Castles in Cardiff
Scheduled monuments in Cardiff
Motte-and-bailey castles